COPRA Press is an American media company based in New York, NY.

History
COPRA Press was founded in 2011 by Michel Fiffe with the goal of publishing comics and graphic novels they would want to read. Unsatisfied with the material that was dominating the industry, they believed firmly that sequential art could be used to tell virtually any story.

Publication history
COPRA is a self-published comic book that is written, drawn, inked, colored, lettered, edited, packed, and shipped by creator Michel Fiffe. COPRA made its internet debut on Fiffe's Etsy store on November 8, 2012. COPRA #1 made its public debut on November 10, 2012 at the Brooklyn Comics and Graphics Festival.

Fiffe self-publishes individual issues under the name  Press.  #1 and #2 had print runs of 400 copies. All 400 copies of the original run were personally signed and numbered by the artist. When the first two issues sold out, second runs of 400 copies of each were made. The print runs of  #3–6 were increased to 600 copies. The runs for issues #7-12 were 800 copies each.  #13-16 were 2000 copies. The runs for issues #17-25 were reduced to 1000 copies each. By  #26, print runs were stabilized at 900 copies. Issue #25 Limited to 35 signed and numbered copies, these “naked” (logo-less) editions were assigned to family and friends. The first two issues of the mini-series  Versus had a print run of 1000 copies for each issue. Giant-Size  Versus, collecting  Versus #3-5, had a print run of 600 copies. The satellite project Negativeland had a print run of 300 copies and was offered exclusively to Fiffe's Patreon subscribers.

Bergen Street Press published trade paperback collections of the individual issues of  starting in March 2013. The  Compendium collected the first three issues. The  Compendium Two (July 2013) collected issues #4-6. The  Compendium Three (November 2013) collected issues #7-9. The  Compendium was translated into Spanish and republished by Inefable Tebeos as  Compendio Uno (September 2015). A signed, limited edition of the first collection was produced for Isotope Comics Lounge in October 2014. : Round Two (#7-12) was published in January 2015, followed by : Round Three (#13-18) in September of the same year. : Round Four (#19-24) was published in August 2016. : Round Five (#26-31), in April 2018.

In May 2019,  Press left Bergen Street Press and began publishing with Image Comics.

Awards

|-
| 2018
|  Round Five,  Versus, Negativeland
| The Comics Journal: The Best Comics of 2018
| 
|-
| 2017
| Zegas
| The Beat's Best Comics of 2017
| 
|-
| 2017
| Zegas
| The Hundreds Best of 2017: Graphic novels
| 
|-
| 2017
| 
| ComicBook.com's 10 Best Indie Comics of 2017
| 
|-
| 2017
| 
| ComicBook.com 2017 Golden Issue Awards: Best comic series
| 
|-
| 2016
| 
| Comicsverse: Best Indie Comics of 2016
| 
|-
| 2016
| 
| Paste: The 25 Best Comic Books of 2016
| 
|-
| 2015
| 
| ComicBook.com's Best Comics of 2015
| 
|-
| 2015
| 
| The Beat's Best Comics of 2015
| 
|-
| 2015
| 
| Comics Alliance Best of 2015: Continued excellence in serial comics
| 
|-
| 2015
| 
| Paste: The Best Comic Books of 2015
| 
|-
| 2015
| 
| Tech Times: The Best Comics of 2015 As Chosen by the Artists
| 
|-
| 2014
| 
| ComicBook.Com's Best Comics of 2014
| 
|-
| 2014
| Michel Fiffe
| The Newest Rant: 2014 In Review — Best writer-artist
| 
|-
| 2014
| 
| Comicosity: Best of 2014: Matt Santori's pick for best graphic novel
| 
|-
| 2014
| 
| Journeys in Darkness and Light: Best Graphic Novels Published in 2014
| 
|-
| 2014
| 
| The A.V. Club: The Best Comics of 2014: Ongoing and special series
| 
|-
| 2014
| Michel Fiffe
| Comics Alliance Reader Choice Awards: Best writer/artist
| 
|-
| 2013
| 
| Comics Bulletin: Top 10 Ongoing Series of 2013
| 
|-
| 2013
| 
| Brainleak Station 12: Best of 2013
| 
|-
| 2013
| 
| Broken Frontier Awards 2013: Best ongoing series
| 
|-
| 2013
| 
| CBR's Top 100 Comics of 2013
| 
|-
| 2013
| 
| CBR: The Ten Best Comics of 2013
| 
|-
| 2013
| 
| Comics Alliance: The Best Comic Books of 2013: Best comics about squads on suicide missions
| 
|-
| 2013
| 
| Graphic Novel Universe: Best Graphic Novels of 2013
| 
|-
| 2013
| 
| Best of 5773
| 
|-
| 2012
| 
| The Comics Journal: The 19 Best Comics of 2012
| 
|-
| 2012
| 
| Hellboy Memorial Awards: Comics Alliance's Best Comics of 2012: Best comics about squads on suicide missions
| 
|-
| 2012
| 
| CBR: The 10 Best Comics of 2012
| 
|-
| 2011
| Zegas
| Best of 5771
|

Further reading

Zegas reviews

Interviews
 Smash Pages “Q&A: Michel Fiffe on ‘Zegas’” by Tim O’Shea

References

Footnotes

Citations

Bibliography

External links
 Michel Fiffe website

2011 establishments in New York City
American companies established in 2011
Comic book publishing companies of the United States
Companies based in New York City
Privately held companies based in New York (state)
Publishing companies established in 2011
Book publishing companies based in New York (state)